The Dorothea von Stetten Art Award (German: Dorothea von Stetten Kunstpreis) has been awarded biennially since 1984 to an artist under the age of 36 whose work demonstrates interesting perspective and possibilities for advancement.

It is not possible to apply for consideration, as an independent nomination committee selects five nominees
whose work is then judged by a five strong jury of experts. The jury, which cannot include any person of the nomination committee, has the final decision on who should receive the prize.

The award consists of 10,000 euro and an exhibition in the Kunstmuseum Bonn (Bonn Art Museum ), Germany.

Former prize winners 

 1984 – Sigrun Jakubaschke
 1986 – Klaus vom Bruch
 1988 – Jochen Fischer
 1990 – Barbara Hee
 1992 – Berend Strik
 1994 – Thomas Florschuetz
 1996 – Gregor Schneider
 1998 – Tamara Grcic
 2000 – Johannes Kahrs
 2002 – Nicole Wermers
 2004 – Yael Bartana
 2006 – Yves Mettler
 2008 – Kristoffer Akselbo
 2010 – Oliver Foulon, Melissa Gordon, Alicja Kwade, Alexandra Leykauf, Tina Schulz
 2012 – Katinka Bock
 2014 – Eva Koťátková
 2016 – Taocheng Wang 
 2018 – Masar Sohail
 2020 – Hannah Weinberger

See also

 List of European art awards

References

Sources 
 Dorothea-von-Stetten-Kunstpreis 2004, Stadt Bonn  
 Museum's activity list, Essen University : German

German awards
Visual arts awards
Awards established in 1984